The Almohad Caliphate (or  or  from ) was a North African Berber Muslim empire founded in the 12th century. At its height, it controlled much of the Iberian Peninsula (Al-Andalus) and North Africa (the Maghreb).

The Almohad movement was founded by Ibn Tumart among the Berber Masmuda tribes, but the Almohad caliphate and its ruling dynasty were founded after his death by Abd al-Mu'min al-Gumi. Around 1120, Ibn Tumart first established a Berber state in Tinmel in the Atlas Mountains. Under Abd al-Mu'min (r. 1130–1163) they succeeded in overthrowing the ruling Almoravid dynasty governing Morocco in 1147, when he conquered Marrakesh and declared himself caliph. They then extended their power over all of the Maghreb by 1159. Al-Andalus soon followed, and all of Muslim Iberia was under Almohad rule by 1172.

The turning point of their presence in the Iberian Peninsula came in 1212, when Muhammad III, "al-Nasir" (1199–1214) was defeated at the Battle of Las Navas de Tolosa in the Sierra Morena by an alliance of the Christian forces from Castile, Aragon and Navarre. Much of the remaining territories of al-Andalus were lost in the ensuing decades, with the cities of Córdoba and Seville falling to the Christians in 1236 and 1248 respectively.

The Almohads continued to rule in Africa until the piecemeal loss of territory through the revolt of tribes and districts enabled the rise of their most effective enemies, the Marinids, from northern Morocco in 1215. The last representative of the line, Idris al-Wathiq, was reduced to the possession of Marrakesh, where he was murdered by a slave in 1269; the Marinids seized Marrakesh, ending the Almohad domination of the Western Maghreb.

History

Origins
The Almohad movement originated with Ibn Tumart, a member of the Masmuda, a Berber tribal confederation of the Atlas Mountains of southern Morocco. At the time, Morocco, western Algeria and Spain (al-Andalus), were under the rule of the Almoravids, a Sanhaja Berber dynasty. Early in his life, Ibn Tumart went to Spain to pursue his studies, and thereafter to Baghdad to deepen them. In Baghdad, Ibn Tumart attached himself to the theological school of al-Ash'ari, and came under the influence of the teacher al-Ghazali. He soon developed his own system, combining the doctrines of various masters. Ibn Tumart's main principle was a strict unitarianism (tawhid), which denied the independent existence of the attributes of God as being incompatible with His unity, and therefore a polytheistic idea. Ibn Tumart represented a revolt against what he perceived as anthropomorphism in Muslim orthodoxy. His followers would become known as the al-Muwaḥḥidūn ("Almohads"), meaning those who affirm the unity of God.

After his return to the Maghreb c. 1117, Ibn Tumart spent some time in various Ifriqiyan cities, preaching and agitating, heading riotous attacks on wine-shops and on other manifestations of laxity. He laid the blame for the latitude on the ruling dynasty of the Almoravids, whom he accused of obscurantism and impiety. He also opposed their sponsorship of the Maliki school of jurisprudence, which drew upon consensus (ijma) and other sources beyond the Qur'an and Sunnah in their reasoning, an anathema to the stricter Zahirism favored by Ibn Tumart. His antics and fiery preaching led fed-up authorities to move him along from town to town. After being expelled from Bejaia, Ibn Tumart set up camp in Mellala, in the outskirts of the city, where he received his first disciples – notably, al-Bashir (who would become his chief strategist) and Abd al-Mu'min (a Zenata Berber, who would later become his successor).

In 1120, Ibn Tumart and his small band of followers proceeded to Morocco, stopping first in Fez, where he briefly engaged the Maliki scholars of the city in debate. He even went so far as to assault the sister of the Almoravid emir ʿAli ibn Yusuf, in the streets of Fez, because she was going about unveiled, after the manner of Berber women. After being expelled from Fez, he went to Marrakesh, where he successfully tracked down the Almoravid emir Ali ibn Yusuf at a local mosque, and challenged the emir, and the leading scholars of the area, to a doctrinal debate. After the debate, the scholars concluded that Ibn Tumart's views were blasphemous and the man dangerous, and urged him to be put to death or imprisoned. But the emir decided merely to expel him from the city.

Ibn Tumart took refuge among his own people, the Hargha, in his home village of Igiliz (exact location uncertain), in the Sous valley. He retreated to a nearby cave, and lived out an ascetic lifestyle, coming out only to preach his program of puritan reform, attracting greater and greater crowds. At length, towards the end of Ramadan in late 1121, after a particularly moving sermon, reviewing his failure to persuade the Almoravids to reform by argument, Ibn Tumart 'revealed' himself as the true Mahdi, a divinely guided judge and lawgiver, and was recognized as such by his audience. This was effectively a declaration of war on the Almoravid state.

On the advice of one of his followers, Omar Hintati, a prominent chieftain of the Hintata, Ibn Tumart abandoned his cave in 1122 and went up into the High Atlas, to organize the Almohad movement among the highland Masmuda tribes. Besides his own tribe, the Hargha, Ibn Tumart secured the adherence of the Ganfisa, the Gadmiwa, the Hintata, the Haskura, and the Hazraja to the Almohad cause. Around 1124, Ibn Tumart erected the ribat of Tinmel, in the valley of the Nfis in the High Atlas, an impregnable fortified complex, which would serve both as the spiritual center and military headquarters of the Almohad movement.

For the first eight years, the Almohad rebellion was limited to a guerilla war along the peaks and ravines of the High Atlas. Their principal damage was in rendering insecure (or altogether impassable) the roads and mountain passes south of Marrakesh – threatening the route to all-important Sijilmassa, the gateway of the trans-Saharan trade. Unable to send enough manpower through the narrow passes to dislodge the Almohad rebels from their easily defended mountain strong points, the Almoravid authorities reconciled themselves to setting up strongholds to confine them there (most famously the fortress of Tasghîmût that protected the approach to Aghmat, which was conquered by the Almohads in 1132), while exploring alternative routes through more easterly passes.

Ibn Tumart organized the Almohads as a commune, with a minutely detailed structure. At the core was the Ahl ad-dār ("House of the Mahdi:), composed of Ibn Tumart's family. This was supplemented by two councils: an inner Council of Ten, the Mahdi's privy council, composed of his earliest and closest companions; and the consultative Council of Fifty, composed of the leading sheikhs of the Masmuda tribes. The early preachers and missionaries (ṭalaba and huffāẓ) also had their representatives. Militarily, there was a strict hierarchy of units. The Hargha tribe coming first (although not strictly ethnic; it included many "honorary" or "adopted" tribesmen from other ethnicities, e.g. Abd al-Mu'min himself). This was followed by the men of Tinmel, then the other Masmuda tribes in order, and rounded off by the black fighters, the ʻabīd. Each unit had a strict internal hierarchy, headed by a mohtasib, and divided into two factions: one for the early adherents, another for the late adherents, each headed by a mizwar (or amzwaru); then came the sakkakin (treasurers), effectively the money-minters, tax-collectors, and bursars, then came the regular army (jund), then the religious corps – the muezzins, the hafidh and the hizb – followed by the archers, the conscripts, and the slaves. Ibn Tumart's closest companion and chief strategist, al-Bashir, took upon himself the role of "political commissar", enforcing doctrinal discipline among the Masmuda tribesmen, often with a heavy hand.

In early 1130, the Almohads finally descended from the mountains for their first sizeable attack in the lowlands. It was a disaster. The Almohads swept aside an Almoravid column that had come out to meet them before Aghmat, and then chased their remnant all the way to Marrakesh. They laid siege to Marrakesh for forty days until, in April (or May) 1130, the Almoravids sallied from the city and crushed the Almohads in the bloody Battle of al-Buhayra (named after a large garden east of the city). The Almohads were thoroughly routed, with huge losses. Half their leadership was killed in action, and the survivors only just managed to scramble back to the mountains.

Ibn Tumart died shortly after, in August 1130. That the Almohad movement did not immediately collapse after such a devastating defeat and the death of their charismatic Mahdi, is likely due to the skills of his successor, Abd al-Mu'min. Ibn Tumart's death was kept a secret for three years, a period which Almohad chroniclers described as a ghayba or "occultation". This period likely gave Abd al-Mu'min time to secure his position as successor to the political leadership of the movement. Although a Zenata Berber from Tagra (Algeria), and thus an alien among the Masmuda of southern Morocco, Abd al-Mu'min nonetheless saw off his principal rivals and hammered wavering tribes back to the fold. In an ostentatious gesture of defiance, in 1132, if only to remind the emir that the Almohads were not finished, Abd al-Mu'min led an audacious night operation that seized Tasghîmût fortress and dismantled it thoroughly, carting off its great gates back to Tinmel. Three years after Ibn Tumart's death he was officially proclaimed "Caliph".

In order to neutralise the Masmudas, to whom he was a stranger, Abd al-Mumin relied on his tribe of origin, the Kumiyas (a berber tribe from Orania), which he integrated massively into the army and within the Almohad power. He thus appointed his son as his successor and his other children as governors of the provinces of the Caliphate. The Kumiyas would later form the bodyguard of Abd al Mumin and his successor. In addition, he also relied on Arabs, representatives of the great Hilalian families, whom he deported to Morocco to weaken the influence of the Masmuda sheikhs. These moves have the effect of advancing the Arabisation of the future Morocco.

Al-Andalus
Abd al-Mu'min then came forward as the lieutenant of the Mahdi Ibn Tumart. Between 1130 and his death in 1163, Abd al-Mu'min not only rooted out the Almoravids, but extended his power over all northern Africa as far as Egypt, becoming amir of Marrakesh in 1147.

Al-Andalus followed the fate of Africa. Between 1146 and 1173, the Almohads gradually wrested control from the Almoravids over the Moorish principalities in Iberia. The Almohads transferred the capital of Muslim Iberia from Córdoba to Seville. They founded a great mosque there; its tower, the Giralda, was erected in 1184 to mark the accession of Ya'qub I. The Almohads also built a palace there called Al-Muwarak on the site of the modern day Alcázar of Seville.

The Almohad princes had a longer and more distinguished career than the Almoravids. The successors of Abd al-Mumin, Abu Yaqub Yusuf (Yusuf I, ruled 1163–1184) and Abu Yusuf Yaqub al-Mansur (Yaʻqūb I, ruled 1184–1199), were both able men. Initially their government drove many Jewish and Christian subjects to take refuge in the growing Christian states of Portugal, Castile, and Aragon. Ultimately they became less fanatical than the Almoravids, and Ya'qub al-Mansur was a highly accomplished man who wrote a good Arabic style and protected the philosopher Averroes. In 1190–1191, he campaigned in southern Portugal and won back territory lost in 1189. His title of "al-Manṣūr" ("the Victorious") was earned by his victory over Alfonso VIII of Castile in the Battle of Alarcos (1195).

From the time of Yusuf II, however, the Almohads governed their co-religionists in Iberia and central North Africa through lieutenants, their dominions outside Morocco being treated as provinces. When Almohad emirs crossed the Straits it was to lead a jihad against the Christians and then return to Morocco.

Holding years

In 1212, the Almohad Caliph Muhammad 'al-Nasir' (1199–1214), the successor of al-Mansur, after an initially successful advance north, was defeated by an alliance of the four Christian kings of Castile, Aragón, Navarre, and Portugal, at the Battle of Las Navas de Tolosa in the Sierra Morena. The battle broke the Almohad advance, but the Christian powers remained too disorganized to profit from it immediately.

Before his death in 1213, al-Nasir appointed his young ten-year-old son as the next caliph Yusuf II "al-Mustansir". The Almohads passed through a period of effective regency for the young caliph, with power exercised by an oligarchy of elder family members, palace bureaucrats and leading nobles. The Almohad ministers were careful to negotiate a series of truces with the Christian kingdoms, which remained more-or-less in place for next fifteen years (the loss of Alcácer do Sal to the Kingdom of Portugal in 1217 was an exception).

In early 1224, the youthful caliph died in an accident, without any heirs. The palace bureaucrats in Marrakesh, led by the wazir Uthman ibn Jam'i, quickly engineered the election of his elderly grand-uncle, Abd al-Wahid I 'al-Makhlu', as the new Almohad caliph. But the rapid appointment upset other branches of the family, notably the brothers of the late al-Nasir, who governed in al-Andalus. The challenge was immediately raised by one of them, then governor in Murcia, who declared himself Caliph Abdallah al-Adil. With the help of his brothers, he quickly seized control of al-Andalus. His chief advisor, the shadowy Abu Zayd ibn Yujjan, tapped into his contacts in Marrakesh, and secured the deposition and assassination of Abd al-Wahid I, and the expulsion of the al-Jami'i clan.

This coup has been characterized as the pebble that finally broke al-Andalus. It was the first internal coup among the Almohads. The Almohad clan, despite occasional disagreements, had always remained tightly knit and loyally behind dynastic precedence. Caliph al-Adil's murderous breach of dynastic and constitutional propriety marred his acceptability to other Almohad sheikhs. One of the recusants was his cousin, Abd Allah al-Bayyasi ("the Baezan"), the Almohad governor of Jaén, who took a handful of followers and decamped for the hills around Baeza. He set up a rebel camp and forged an alliance with the hitherto quiet Ferdinand III of Castile. Sensing his greater priority was Marrakesh, where recusant Almohad sheikhs had rallied behind Yahya, another son of al-Nasir, al-Adil paid little attention to this little band of misfits.

Reconquista 

In 1225, Abd Allah al-Bayyasi's band of rebels, accompanied by a large Castilian army, descended from the hills, besieging cities such as Jaén and Andújar. They raided throughout the regions of Jaén, Cordova and Vega de Granada and, before the end of the year, al-Bayyasi had established himself in the city of Cordova. Sensing a power vacuum, both Alfonso IX of León and Sancho II of Portugal opportunistically ordered raids into Andalusian territory that same year. With Almohad arms, men and cash dispatched to Morocco to help Caliph al-Adil impose himself in Marrakesh, there was little means to stop the sudden onslaught. In late 1225, with surprising ease, the Portuguese raiders reached the environs of Seville. Knowing they were outnumbered, the Almohad governors of the city refused to confront the Portuguese raiders, prompting the disgusted population of Seville to take matters into their own hands, raise a militia, and go out in the field by themselves. The result was a veritable massacre – the Portuguese men-at-arms easily mowed down the throng of poorly armed townsfolk. Thousands, perhaps as much as 20,000, were said to have been slain before the walls of Seville. A similar disaster befell a similar popular levy by Murcians at Aspe that same year. But Christian raiders had been stopped at Cáceres and Requena. Trust in the Almohad leadership was severely shaken by these events – the disasters were promptly blamed on the distractions of Caliph al-Adil and the incompetence and cowardice of his lieutenants, the successes credited to non-Almohad local leaders who rallied defenses.

But al-Adil's fortunes were briefly buoyed. In payment for Castilian assistance, al-Bayyasi had given Ferdinand III three strategic frontier fortresses: Baños de la Encina, Salvatierra (the old Order of Calatrava fortress near Ciudad Real) and Capilla. But Capilla refused to hand them over, forcing the Castilians to lay a long and difficult siege. The brave defiance of little Capilla, and the spectacle of al-Bayyasi's shipping provisions to the Castilian besiegers, shocked Andalusians and shifted sentiment back towards the Almohad caliph. A popular uprising broke out in Cordova – al-Bayyasi was killed and his head dispatched as a trophy to Marrakesh. But Caliph al-Adil did not rejoice in this victory for long – he was assassinated in Marrakesh in October 1227, by the partisans of Yahya, who was promptly acclaimed as the new Almohad caliph Yahya "al-Mu'tasim".

The Andalusian branch of the Almohads refused to accept this turn of events. Al-Adil's brother, then in Seville, proclaimed himself the new Almohad caliph Abd al-Ala Idris I 'al-Ma'mun'. He promptly purchased a truce from Ferdinand III in return for 300,000 maravedis, allowing him to organize and dispatch the greater part of the Almohad army in Spain across the straits in 1228 to confront Yahya.

That same year, Portuguese and Leonese renewed their raids deep into Muslim territory, basically unchecked. Feeling the Almohads had failed to protect them, popular uprisings took place throughout al-Andalus. City after city deposed their hapless Almohad governors and installed local strongmen in their place. A Murcian strongman, Muhammad ibn Yusuf ibn Hud al-Judhami, who claimed descendance from the Banu Hud dynasty that had once ruled the old taifa of Saragossa, emerged as the central figure of these rebellions, systematically dislodging Almohad garrisons through central Spain. In October 1228, with Spain practically all lost, al-Ma'mun abandoned Seville, taking what little remained of the Almohad army with him to Morocco. Ibn Hud immediately dispatched emissaries to distant Baghdad to offer recognition to the Abbasid Caliph, albeit taking up for himself a quasi-caliphal title, 'al-Mutawwakil'.

The departure of al-Ma'mun in 1228 marked the end of the Almohad era in Spain. Ibn Hud and the other local Andalusian strongmen were unable to stem the rising flood of Christian attacks, launched almost yearly by Sancho II of Portugal, Alfonso IX of León, Ferdinand III of Castile and James I of Aragon. The next twenty years saw a massive advance in the Christian reconquista – the old great Andalusian citadels fell in a grand sweep: Mérida and Badajoz in 1230 (to Leon), Majorca in 1230 (to Aragon), Beja in 1234 (to Portugal), Cordova in 1236 (to Castile), Valencia in 1238 (to Aragon), Niebla-Huelva in 1238 (to Leon), Silves in 1242 (to Portugal), Murcia in 1243 (to Castile), Jaén in 1246 (to Castile), Alicante in 1248 (to Castile), culminating in the fall of the greatest of Andalusian cities, the ex-Almohad capital of Seville, into Christian hands in 1248. Ferdinand III of Castile entered Seville as a conqueror on December 22, 1248.

The Andalusians were helpless before this onslaught. Ibn Hudd had attempted to check the Leonese advance early on, but most of his Andalusian army was destroyed at the battle of Alange in 1230. Ibn Hud scrambled to move remaining arms and men to save threatened or besieged Andalusian citadels, but with so many attacks at once, it was a hopeless endeavor. After Ibn Hud's death in 1238, some of the Andalusian cities, in a last-ditch effort to save themselves, offered themselves once again to the Almohads, but to no avail. The Almohads would not return.

With the departure of the Almohads, the Nasrid dynasty ("Banū Naṣr") rose to power in Granada. After the great Christian advance of 1228–1248, the Emirate of Granada was practically all that remained of old al-Andalus. Some of the captured citadels (e.g. Murcia, Jaen, Niebla) were reorganized as tributary vassals for a few more years, but most were annexed by the 1260s. Granada alone would remain independent for an additional 250 years, flourishing as the new center of al-Andalus.

Collapse in the Maghreb
In their African holdings, the Almohads encouraged the establishment of Christians even in Fez, and after the Battle of Las Navas de Tolosa they occasionally entered into alliances with the kings of Castile. They were successful in expelling the garrisons placed in some of the coast towns by the Norman kings of Sicily. The history of their decline differs from that of the Almoravids, whom they had displaced. They were not assailed by a great religious movement, but lost territories, piecemeal, by the revolt of tribes and districts. Their most effective enemies were the Banu Marin (Marinids) who founded the next dynasty. The last representative of the line, Idris II, 'al-Wathiq', was reduced to the possession of Marrakesh, where he was murdered by a slave in 1269.

Culture

Language 
The use of Berber language was important in Almohad doctrine. For example, the khaṭīb, or sermon-giver, of al-Qarawiyyīn Mosque in Fes, Mahdī b. ‘Īsā, was replaced under the Almohads by Abū l-Ḥasan b. ‘Aṭiyya khaṭīb because he was fluent in Berber. 

As the Almohads rejected the status of Dhimma, the Almohad conquest of al-Andalus caused the emigration of Andalusi Christians from southern Iberia to the Christian north, which had an impact on the use of Romance within Almohad territory. After the Almohad period, Muslim territories in Iberia were reduced to the Emirate of Granada, in which the percentage of the population that had converted to Islam reached 90% and Arabic-Romance bilingualism seems to have disappeared.

Literature 

The Almohads worked to suppress the influence of Maliki fiqh—even publicly burning copies of Muwatta Imam Malik and Maliki commentaries. They sought to disseminate the doctrine of Ibn Tumart, author of E'az Ma Yutlab ( The Most Noble Calling), Muhadhi al-Muwatta' ( Counterpart of the Muwatta'''), and Talkhis Sahih Muslim ( Compendium of Sahih Muslim).

Literary production continued despite the devastating effect the Almohad reforms had on cultural life in their domain. Almohad universities continued the knowledge of preceding Andalusi scholars as well as ancient Greco-Roman writers; contemporary literary figures included Ibn Rushd (Averroes), Hafsa bint al-Hajj al-Rukuniyya, Ibn Tufail, Ibn Zuhr, Ibn al-Abbar, Ibn Amira and many more poets, philosophers, and scholars. The abolishment of the dhimmi status further stifled the once flourishing Jewish Andalusi cultural scene; Maimonides went east and many Jews moved to Castillian-controlled Toledo.

According to the research of Muhammad al-Manuni, there were 400 paper mills in Fes under the reign of Sutlan Yaqub al-Mansur in the 12th century.

 Theology and philosophy 

The Almohad ideology preached by Ibn Tumart is described by Amira Bennison as a "sophisticated hybrid form of Islam that wove together strands from Hadith science, Zahiri and Shafi'i fiqh, Ghazalian social actions (hisba), and spiritual engagement with Shi'i notions of the imam and mahdi". This contrasted with the highly orthodox or traditionalist Maliki school (maddhab) of Sunni Islam which predominated in the region up to that point. Central to his philosophy, Ibn Tumart preached a fundamentalist or radical version of tawhid – referring to a strict monotheism or to the "oneness of God". This notion gave the movement its name: al-Muwaḥḥidūn, meaning roughly "those who advocate tawhid", which was adapted to "Almohads" in European writings. Ibn Tumart saw his movement as a revolutionary reform movement much as early Islam saw itself relative to the Christianity and Judaism which preceded it, with himself as its mahdi and leader.

In terms of Muslim jurisprudence, the state gave recognition to the Zahiri school of thought, though Shafi'ites were also given a measure of authority at times. While not all Almohad leaders were Zahirites, quite a few of them were not only adherents of the legal school but also well-versed in its tenets. Additionally, all Almohad leaders – both the religiously learned and the laymen – were hostile toward the Malikite school favored by the Almoravids. During the reign of Abu Yaqub, chief judge Ibn Maḍāʾ oversaw the banning of all religious books written by non-Zahirites; when Abu Yaqub's son Abu Yusuf took the throne, he ordered Ibn Maḍāʾ to undertake the actual burning of such books.

In terms of Islamic theology, the Almohads were Ash'arites, their Zahirite-Ash'arism giving rise to a complicated blend of literalist jurisprudence and esoteric dogmatics.Pascal Buresi and Hicham El Aallaoui, Governing the Empire: Provincial Administration in the Almohad Caliphate 1224–1269, p. 170. Volume 3 of Studies in the History and Society of the Maghrib. Leiden: Brill Publishers, 2012.  Some authors occasionally describe Almohads as heavily influenced by Mu'tazilism. Scholar Madeline Fletcher argues that while one of Ibn Tumart's original teachings, the murshidas (a collection of sayings memorized by his followers), holds positions on the attributes of God which might be construed as moderately Mu'tazilite (and which were criticized as such by Ibn Taimiyya), identifying him with Mu'tazilites would be an exaggeration. She points out that another of his main texts, the 'aqida (which was likely edited by others after him), demonstrates a much clearer Ash'arite position on a number of issues.

Nonetheless, the Almohads, particularly from the reign of Caliph Abu Yusuf Ya'qub al-Mansur onward, embraced the use of logical reasoning as a method of validating the more central Almohad concept of tawhid. This effectively provided a religious justification for philosophy and for a rationalist intellectualism in Almohad religious thought. Al-Mansur's father, Abu Ya'qub Yusuf, had also shown some favour towards philosophy and kept the philosopher Ibn Tufayl as his confidant. Ibn Tufayl in turn introduced Ibn Rush (Averroes) to the Almohad court, to whom Al-Mansur gave patronage and protection. Although Ibn Rushd (who was also an Islamic judge) saw rationalism and philosophy as complimentary to religion and revelation, his views failed to convince the traditional Maliki ulema, with whom the Almohads were already at odds. After the decline of Almohadism, Maliki Sunnism ultimately became the dominant official religious doctrine of the region. By contrast, the teachings of Ibn Rushd and other philosophers like him were far more influential for Jewish philosophers – including Maimonides, his contemporary – and Christian Latin scholars – like Thomas Aquinas – who later promoted his commentaries on Aristotle.

 Art 

 Calligraphy and manuscripts 
The Almohad dynasty embraced a style of cursive Maghrebi script known today as "Maghrebi thuluth" as an official style used in manuscripts, coinage, documents, and architecture. However, the more angular Kufic script was still used, albeit in a reworked form in Qur'an epigraphy, and was seen detailed in silver in some colophons.Bongianino, Umberto (18 May 2021). Untold Stories of Maghrebi Qur'ans (12th-14th centuries) (Lecture). The Maghrebi thuluth script, frequently written in gold, was used to give emphasis when standard writing, written in rounded Maghrebi mabsūt script, was considered insufficient. Maghrebi mabsūt of the al-Andalus region during the 12th to 14th centuries was characterized by elongated lines, stretched out curves, and the use of multiple colors for vocalizations, as derived from the people of Medina.

Scribes and calligraphers of the Almohad period also started to illuminate words and phrases in manuscripts for emphasis, using gold leaf and lapis lazuli. While much of the script was written in black or brown ink, the use of polychromy for diacritical text and vocalizations also marked a departure from previous caliphates' calligraphic styles. Blue dots were used to indicate elif, orange dots denoted hamza, and yellow semicircles to marked shaddah. Separate sets of verses were denoted by various medallions, with distinctive designs for each set. For example, sets of five verses were ended with bud-like medallions while sets of ten were marked by circular medallions, all of which were typically painted in gold. Manuscripts attributed to this caliphate were characterized by interlacing geometric or recti-curvilinear illuminations, and abstract vegetal artwork and large medallions were often present in the margins and as thumbnails. Composite floral finials were also frequently used in decorating the margins and corners of the page. Color schemes focused on primarily using gold, white, and blue, with accentuating elements in red or pink.

During the Almohad dynasty, the act of bookbinding itself took on great importance, with a notable instance of the Almohad caliph Abd al-Mu'min bringing in artisans for a celebration of the binding of a Qur'an imported from Cordoba. Books were most frequently bound in goatskin leather and decorated with polygonal interlacing, goffering, and stamping. The primary materials used for the pages were goat or sheep vellum. However, the Almohad dynasty also saw industrial advancements in the spread of paper mills in Seville and Marrakesh, leading to the introduction of paper for Qur'an manuscripts, illuminated doctrine books, and official documents.Barrucand, Marianne (2005). Les Enluminares de l'Epoque Almohade: Frontispices et Unwans. Estudios Arabes e Islamicos. p. 72-74. Most Qur'anic manuscripts were close to square-shaped, though other religious texts were typically vertically oriented. With the exception of a few large-scale Qur'ans, most were modestly sized, ranging from 11 centimenters to 22 centimeters on each side, with 19 to 27 lines of script each page. In contrast, large-sized Qur'ans were typically approximately 60 centimeters by 53 centimeters and had an average of five to nine lines of script to a page, typically in Maghrebi thuluth.

Hadith Bayāḍ wa Riyāḍ, the love story of Bayad and Riyad, is one of the few remaining illustrated manuscripts dated to 13th century Almohad caliphate. Its use of miniatures displays a clear connection with previous illustrated tradition from the eastern Islamic world. However, it deviates in its depictions of the frontispiece, interior, and teaching scenes, which show similarities to scientific manuscripts from the central Islamic world, typically considered to have consisted of the Arabian peninsula, northeast modern Iran, and the Fertile Crescent. Depictions of architecture specific to the Almohad caliphate are also evident in several places in the manuscript.The penultimate Almohad caliph, Abu Hafs al-Murtada, was a notable calligrapher in his own right and composed poems and copied Qur'ans. A known bibliophile, he frequently endowed books to madrasas and mosques and established the first public manuscript transcription center in Marrakesh. One of the large Qur'ans that he copied has been preserved in Marrakesh and is the oldest surviving example in the western Islamic world of a Qur'an personally produced by a sovereign ruler. The 10-volume tome is written on parchment and bound with a leather cover decorated with a geometric motif, exhibiting the first dated use of gold tooling on a manuscript binding. The verses are written in Maghrebi mabsūt script and the end of each verse is marked by a gold circle divided into eight uniform segments. Using large Maghrebi script, there are five to 10 lines to a page, with relatively few words to each line. There is lavish use of gold, and this Qur'an, as with other Qur'ans of this size, was likely intended for court use.

 Textiles 

The Almohads initially eschewed the production of luxury textiles and silks, but eventually they too engaged in this production. Almohad textiles, like earlier Almoravid examples, were often decorated with a grid of roundels filled with ornamental designs or Arabic epigraphy. However, textiles produced by Almohad workshops used progressively less figural decoration than previous Almoravid textiles, in favour of interlacing geometric and vegetal motifs.

One of the best-known Almohad textiles is the "Las Navas de Tolosa Banner", so-called because it was once thought to be a spoil won by Alfonso VIII at the Battle of Las Navas de Tolosa in 1212. More recent studies have determined that it was actually a spoil won some years later by Ferdinand III. The banner was then donated to the Monastery of Santa Maria la Real de Huelgas in Burgos, where it remains today. The banner is richly designed and features blue Arabic inscriptions and white decorative patterns on a red background. The central motif features an eight-pointed star framed by a circle inside a larger square, with smaller motifs filling the bands of the frame and the corner spaces. This central design is surrounded on four sides by Arabic inscriptions in Naskhi script featuring Qur'anic verses (Surah 61: 10–12), and another horizontal inscription in the banner's upper part which praises God and Muhammad. The banner's design bears similarities with later 14th-century Marinid banners captured at the Battle of Rio Salado. A study by Miriam Ali-de-Unzaga has argued that the banner is actually of Marinid origin, due to its similarities with captured Marinid banners kept at the Cathedral of Toledo. This argument has been endorsed by Amira Bennison.

 Metalwork 

The French historian Henri Terrasse described al-Qarawiyyin's bronze grand chandelier, commissioned by Caliph Muhammad al-Nasir, as "the largest and most beautiful chandelier in the Islamic world." The chandelier consists of a 12-sided copula on top of which is mounted a large cone crowned around its sides with nine levels of candlesticks. The visible surfaces of the chandelier are carved and pierced with intricate floral arabesque motifs as well as Kufic Arabic inscriptions. The chandelier is now the oldest surviving chandelier in the western Islamic world, and it likely served as a model for the later and nearly equally famous Marinid chandelier in the Great Mosque of Taza.

Another important piece, the so-called Monzón Lion, also dates from the Almohad period during the 12 or 13th century and is held in the Louvre Museum today. It is an example of figural bronze sculpture from al-Andalus that continues in the tradition of earlier objects such as the 11th-century Pisa Griffin (kept at the Cathedral Museum of Pisa) and the 10th-century Stag of Córdoba made in Madinat al-Zahra (now kept at the Archeological Museum of Córdoba). It was found in Monzón, near Palencia, but it is not known where exactly in the Iberian Peninsula it was made. As Palencia was outside the Almohad realm, it may have been made by Andalusi craftsman for a Christian patron. The lion, which served as a fountainhead, is sculpted in a highly stylized manner and its articulated tail is adjustable. Its surface is covered in incised decoration consisting of tapestry-like motifs, and a broad Kufic inscription on its side features well-wishes for its owner.

Other surviving metalwork objects from the Almohad period include a series of braziers and lamps discovered in Córdoba and now kept at the Archeological Museum of Córdoba. One of them, a hexagonal brazier, features both incised and pierced decoration. Along with prominent decorative Kufic inscriptions, it has an architectural motif of merlons resembling the decorative sawtooth-shaped merlons found along the tops of Moorish and Moroccan buildings of the same period.

 Ceramics and tilework 

Jonathan Bloom cites the white and green glazed tiles on the minaret of the Kutubiyya Mosque, dating from the mid-12th century in the early Almohad period, as the earliest reliably-dated example of zellij in Morocco. The tiles currently installed on the minaret are modern reproductions of the original decoration, but some of the original tiles were preserved in a collection kept at the Badi Palace. The same collection has also preserved fragments of the original tile decoration on the minaret of the Kasbah Mosque, including fragments of a Kufic inscription which is no longer present on the minaret today. These latter fragments are also the earliest surviving example of cuerda seca tilework (a technique originating in al-Andalus) being used in an architectural context.

 Painted decoration 
The Kutubiyya Mosque's minaret in Marrakesh originally had polychrome painted decoration around the windows and blind arches on its exterior façades, featuring a mix of geometric and vegetal arabesque motifs. In Seville, some Almohad-era houses have been excavated in various locations in the city, particularly on the site of the present-day cathedral. At least one of these excavations have revealed the remains of mural decoration featuring interlacing geometric decoration. Decorations of a hammam dating back to the Almohad period were uncovered in a bar in Seville during renovations in 2020. The decorations feature red ochre paintings of concave hexadecagons and eightfold rosettes on engraved white lime mortar in a pattern that fits the hammam's geometric skylight holes.

 Architecture 

Along with the Almoravid period preceding it, the Almohad period is considered one of the most formative stages of Moroccan and Moorish architecture, establishing many of the forms and motifs that were refined in subsequent centuries. The main sites of Almohad architecture and art include Fes, Marrakesh, Rabat and Seville. In general, Almohad architecture was built mostly in rammed earth and brick rather than stone. These two materials were relatively cheap, readily available at most sites, and already widely used in the preceding centuries. Almohad architects refined both the manufacturing process of these materials and their on-site assembly, making the execution of numerous and ambitious construction projects possible. According to scholar Felix Arnold, during the Almohad period "construction became an industry on a scale not seen since Roman times."

Compared to the earlier Almoravid period and the Taifas or Caliphal period in al-Andalus, early Almohad architecture was much more restrained in its ornamentation, focusing its attention on overall architectural forms rather than on detailed surface decoration. In addition to continuing the integration of Moroccan and Andalusi artistic traditions, some currents in Almohad architecture may also reflect influences from Algeria and Tunisia (Ifriqiya). Some Almohad elements, such as polylobed arches, have their earliest precedents in Fatimid architecture in Ifriqiya and Egypt and had also appeared in Andalusi architecture such as the Aljaferia palace. In the Almohad period, this type of arch was further refined for decorative functions while horseshoe arches continued to be standard elsewhere. The decoration around mihrab arches inside mosques also evolved into richer and more monumental forms in the great ceremonial stone gates of Almohad architecture such as Bab Agnaou in Marrakesh and Bab Oudaia and Bab er-Rouah in Rabat. These gates employed varying decorative motifs arranged in concentric semi-circles around the arch of the gate, all of which was in turn framed inside an outer rectangular band with other motifs. This style remained evident in Marinid gateways (e.g. the main gate of Chellah) and in later Moroccan gateways.

The Almohad Kutubiyya and Tinmal mosques are often considered the prototypes of later Moroccan and Andalusi mosques, although the Great Mosque of Taza (later modified by the Marinids) is the oldest surviving Almohad mosque (begun in 1142). Like earlier mosques in the region, Almohad mosques have interiors consisting of large hypostyle halls divided by rows of arches that create a repetitive visual effect. However, the aisle or "nave" leading towards the mihrab (niche symbolizing the qibla in the southern/southeastern wall) and the aisle running along the qibla wall itself were usually wider than the others and were highlighted with distinctive arches and greater decoration. This layout, already present in Almoravid mosques, is often referred to as the "T-plan" by art historians (because the aisle running parallel to the qibla wall and the aisle leading to the mihrab, perpendicular to it, form a "T" shape), and became standard in mosques of the region for centuries. The minarets of Almohad mosques also established the standard form and style of subsequent minarets in the region, with a square base and two-tiered shaft covered in polylobed arch and darj wa ktaf motifs. The minaret of the Kasbah Mosque of Marrakesh was particularly influential and set a style that was repeated, with minor elaborations, in the following Marinid period. The most famous minarets of this time, however, are the minarets of the Kutubiyya Mosque (begun in 1147 by Abd al-Mu'min but subsequently rebuilt before 1195), the Giralda of Seville (part of a Great Mosque begun in 1171 by Abu Ya'qub Yusuf), and the unfinished "Hassan Tower" of Rabat (part of a huge mosque begun by Abu Yusuf Ya'qub al-Mansur in 1191 but never completed).

The Almohads were also prolific builders of fortifications and forts across their realm. They were responsible for building (or rebuilding) the city walls of Cordoba, Seville, Fes, and Taza, as well as many smaller forts and castles across Morocco and southern Spain and Portugal. In Rabat, Abd al-Mu'min built most of the current Kasbah of the Udayas in 1150–1151 (after having destroyed an earlier Almoravid ribat there), while Abu Yusuf Ya'qub al-Mansur embarked on the construction of a vast new capital and citadel on its south side called Ribat al-Fath (for which the enormous unfinished mosque of the Hassan Tower was also intended). While never finished, this project created the current outer walls of the historic center of Rabat, along with multiple gates such as Bab er-Rouah and the ceremonial main gate of the Kasbah of the Udayas. Al-Mansur also created the Kasbah of Marrakesh, a large royal citadel and palace complex to house the caliph's family and administration. The main public entrance of this kasbah was the ornamental gate of Bab Agnaou. In Seville, the Almohads built the Torre del Oro, a defensive tower on the shores of the Guadalquivir River which dates from 1220 to 1221 and remains a landmark of the city today. Likewise, the Calahorra Tower in Cordoba is believed to be an originally Almohad structure designed to defend the river and the city's old bridge.

The Almohad caliphs also constructed multiple country estates just outside the main cities where they resided, continuing a tradition that existed under the Almoravids. The best-known examples of these estates were centered around large water basins or reservoirs that sustained orchards of fruit trees and other plants. Some of them are referred to as al-Buḥayra ("little sea") in Arabic sources, likely in reference to these artificial lakes. Small palaces or pleasure pavilions were built on the edge of the reservoirs. In Marrakesh, the present-day Agdal and Menara gardens both developed from such Almohad creations. In Seville, the remains of the al-Buḥayra garden, founded in 1171, were excavated and partly restored in the 1970s. A similar garden estate was also created in Rabat but has not been found by archaeologists. The Alcázar Genil (originally called al-Qaṣr as-Sayyid) in Granada, created in the late Almohad period and later remodeled by the Nasrids, stood next to an enormous pool on the outskirts of the city. A small ribat, consisting of a square hall covered by a sixteen-sided dome on squinches, was built nearby at the same time and has been preserved today as a Christian hermitage. Sunken gardens were also part of Almohad palace architecture. In some cases the gardens were divided symmetrically into four parts, much like a riyad garden. Examples of these have been found in several courtyards in the Alcázar of Seville, where former Almohad palaces once stood.

Status of Non-Muslims

The Almohads had taken control of the Almoravid Maghribi and Andalusian territories by 1147. The Almohads rejected the mainstream Islamic doctrine that established the status of dhimmi, a Non-Muslim resident of a Muslim country who was allowed to practice his religion on condition of submission to Muslim rule and payment of jizya.

The treatment and persecution of Jews under Almohad rule was a drastic change. Prior to Almohad rule during the Caliphate of Córdoba, Jewish culture experienced a Golden Age. María Rosa Menocal, a specialist in Iberian literature at Yale University, has argued that "tolerance was an inherent aspect of Andalusian society", and that the Jewish dhimmis living under the Caliphate, while allowed fewer rights than Muslims, were still better off than in Christian Europe. Many Jews migrated to al-Andalus, where they were not just tolerated but allowed to practice their faith openly. Christians had also practiced their religion openly in Córdoba, and both Jews and Christians lived openly in Morocco as well.

The first Almohad ruler, Abd al-Mumin, allowed an initial seven-month grace period. Then he forced most of the urban dhimmi population in Morocco, both Jewish and Christian, to convert to Islam. In 1198, the Almohad emir Abu Yusuf Yaqub al-Mansur decreed that Jews must wear a dark blue garb, with very large sleeves and a grotesquely oversized hat; his son altered the colour to yellow, a change that may have influenced Catholic ordinances some time later. Those who converted had to wear clothing that identified them as Jews since they were not regarded as sincere Muslims. Cases of mass martyrdom of Jews who refused to convert to Islam are recorded. The treatment and persecution of Christians under Almohad rule was a drastic change as well.

Many of the conversions were superficial. Maimonides urged Jews to choose the superficial conversion over martyrdom and argued, "Muslims know very well that we do not mean what we say, and that what we say is only to escape the ruler's punishment and to satisfy him with this simple confession." Abraham Ibn Ezra (1089–1164), who himself fled the persecutions of the Almohads, composed an elegy mourning the destruction of many Jewish communities throughout Spain and the Maghreb under the Almohads.Ross Brann, Power in the Portrayal: Representations of Jews and Muslims in Eleventh- and Twelfth-Century Islamic Spain, Princeton University Press, 2009, pp. 121–122. Many Jews fled from territories ruled by the Almohads to Christian lands, and others, like the family of Maimonides, fled east to more tolerant Muslim lands. However, a few Jewish traders still working in North Africa are recorded.

Idris al-Ma'mun, a late Almohad pretender (ruled 1229–1232 in parts of Morocco), renounced much Almohad doctrine, including the identification of Ibn Tumart as the Mahdi, and the denial of dhimmi'' status. He allowed Jews to practice their religion openly in Marrakesh and even allowed a Christian church there as part of his alliance with Castile. In Iberia, Almohad rule collapsed in the 1200s and was succeeded by several "Taifa" kingdoms, which allowed Jews to practice their religion openly.

List of Almohad caliphs (1121–1269)
 Ibn Tumart 1121–1130
 Abd al-Mu'min 1130–1163
 Abu Ya'qub Yusuf I 1163–1184
 Abu Yusuf Ya'qub 'al-Mansur' 1184–1199
 Muhammad al-Nasir 1199–1213
 Abu Ya'qub Yusuf II 'al-Mustansir' 1213–1224
 Abu Muhammad Abd al-Wahid I 'al-Makhlu' 1224
 Abdallah al-Adil 1224–1227
 Yahya 'al-Mutasim' 1227–1229
 Abu al-Ala Idris I al-Ma'mun, 1229–1232
 Abu Muhammad Abd al-Wahid II 'al-Rashid' 1232–1242
 Abu al-Hassan Ali 'al-Said' 1242–1248
 Abu Hafs Umar 'al-Murtada', 1248–1266
 Abu al-Ula (Abu Dabbus) Idris II 'al-Wathiq' 1266–1269

See also
 List of Mahdi claimants
 Mahdist War

References

Sources

External links
 Almohads Dynasty : Islamic Architecture
 Abd al-Mumin life among Masmudas: Encyclopædia Britannica
 Al-Andalus: the art of Islamic Spain, an exhibition catalog from The Metropolitan Museum of Art (fully available online as PDF), which contains material on Almohad Caliphate (see index)

				

 
Caliphates
Medieval Algeria
History of Gibraltar
12th century in Ifriqiya
13th century in Ifriqiya
Medieval Portugal
11th century in Morocco
12th century in Morocco
13th century in Morocco
12th century in Al-Andalus
13th century in Al-Andalus
Medieval Libya
States and territories established in 1121
States and territories disestablished in the 1260s
1269 disestablishments
Historical transcontinental empires
Former countries
Former theocracies